Pamela Smith Hudson (born 1963) is an African-American woman and Los Angeles-based mixed media artist whose artistic practice includes encaustic painting, ceramics and experimental printmaking.  She graduated from UCLA, where she studied art, art history, museum studies, and dance. Smith Hudson has been sharing her art since 2015 and has had exhibits displayed at CAAM, Over the Influence Gallery and the E.C.Lina gallery.

Early Life 
Hudson got involved in art in the 1990s.

References 

Living people
1963 births
Date of birth missing (living people)
Place of birth missing (living people)
African-American women artists
Artists from Los Angeles
Mixed-media artists
University of California, Los Angeles alumni
21st-century American artists
21st-century American women artists
21st-century African-American women
21st-century African-American artists
20th-century African-American people
20th-century African-American women